The Men's Hockey Champions Challenge II was an international field hockey competition introduced by the International Hockey Federation in 2009. The tournament was held in an uneven year, and contested by eight teams based on the qualification criteria set by the federation that usually not competing in Champions Trophy and Champions Challenge. The winner of the competition will be promoted to subsequent tournament of Champions Challenge.

Summaries

Successful national teams

* = host nation

Team appearances

References

 
Champions Challenge II
Recurring sporting events established in 2009
Recurring sporting events disestablished in 2011